Lord Arthur Pelham-Clinton (23 June 1840 – 18 June 1870), known as Lord Arthur Clinton, was an English aristocrat and Liberal Party politician.  A member of parliament (MP) for three years, he was notorious for involvement in the homosexual scandal and trial of Boulton and Park.

Early life
Clinton was the son of Henry Pelham-Clinton, 5th Duke of Newcastle and Lady Susan Harriet Catherine Hamilton.  He had three brothers and a sister, Lady Susan Vane-Tempest; she became a mistress of future King Edward VII of the United Kingdom in 1864, when he was the 23 year-old Prince of Wales.

His parents divorced in 1850, following the scandal when his mother eloped with her lover, Horatio Walpole, by whom she had an illegitimate son, Horatio. In 1860, his mother would marry for a second time a Belgian, Jean Alexis Opdebeck.

Clinton was educated at Woodcote School, Reading and then Eton College; he entered the Royal Navy in 1854 at the age of 14 and served during the Crimean War in the Baltic Campaign of 1854. He then served in the Naval Brigade during the Indian Mutiny and was present at the Capture of Lucknow. He was promoted to Lieutenant in 1861. In 1863, he was appointed to serve on HMS Revenge. On 10 November 1864, his brother Lord Albert was court-martialled on board HMS Victory at Portsmouth. Charges of "desertion and breaking his parole" were upheld by the court and Lord Albert Pelham-Clinton was sentenced to be dismissed from the navy, although The Times reported that the case referred to Lord Arthur in error.

Member of Parliament
Clinton was elected as an MP for Newark at the general election in July 1865, a seat previously held by his brother Henry Pelham-Clinton, 6th Duke of Newcastle. He was declared bankrupt on 12 November 1868, with debts and liabilities reported to total £70,000. (£ when adjusted for inflation) and stood down as a member of parliament at the subsequent, 1868 general election, which took place between 17 November and 7 December. His successor was the philanthropist, Edward Denison.

Homosexuality
In 1870, Clinton was living with Ernest Boulton, an established cross-gender actor known to the stage and friends as "Stella." Clinton was still, nominally, a naval officer, but he was placed on the retired Navy List on 1 April 1870.

Boulton and Frederick William Park often appeared in public in female dress and, on 28 April 1870, they were arrested and later charged "with conspiring and inciting persons to commit an unnatural offence" with Clinton and others.

Death
Clinton officially died on 18 June 1870, the day after receiving his subpoena for testifying in the trial of Boulton and Park. Ostensibly the cause of death was scarlet fever but it was more probably suicide. At the time there was considerable speculation that he had used his powerful connections – he was the godson of Prime Minister William Gladstone – to flee abroad. In his book Fanny and Stella, biographer Neil McKenna cites circumstantial evidence suggesting that Lord Arthur did indeed live on in exile. Boulton and Park were acquitted.

Criminal impersonation
Twelve years later, on 8 February 1882, Mary Jane Fearneaux and James Gething were arrested in Birmingham and charged with obtaining £2,000 from one man and £3,000 from another under false pretences. Fearneaux was found to have been living for some years as a man in Birmingham while claiming to be Lord Arthur Clinton, saying that the reported death was a fiction contrived by family and friends to avoid disgrace. She sometimes dressed as a woman while impersonating Clinton, while saying that this was a disguise to avoid attention after the notoriety of the Boulton and Park case.

At the subsequent trial of the pair, Gething was acquitted and Fearneaux changed her plea to guilty; she was sentenced to seven years in prison.

See also

 Timeline of LGBT history in Britain

References 
Citations

Bibliography

External links 

Lord Arthur Pelham Clinton, 1861 photograph by Camille Silvy at the National Portrait Gallery, London

1840 births
1870 deaths
1870s suicides
People educated at Eton College
UK MPs 1865–1868
Liberal Party (UK) MPs for English constituencies
Younger sons of dukes
English LGBT politicians
Suicides in England
Arthur
LGBT-related suicides
LGBT members of the Parliament of the United Kingdom
Royal Navy officers
Royal Navy personnel of the Crimean War
LGBT military personnel